Patrick Healy (1938 – 19 July 1970) was an Irish sportsperson. He played hurling with his local club Glen Rovers and is an internationally acclaimed sportsman in tennis, cricket, squash, volleyball and rugby. Healy was also a member of the Cork senior inter-county team in the 1950s. Healy won an All-Ireland runners-up medal as a non playing substitute and one Munster title with Cork in 1956. He won two gold medals for Ireland; this was quite an achievement.

References

1938 births
1970 deaths
Glen Rovers hurlers
Cork inter-county hurlers